Harold John Spencer (30 April 1919 – 2003) was an English professional association footballer who played as a wing half. He started his career at Burnley, where he turned professional in 1937. However, he had to wait until the 1946–47 season to make his debut for the Clarets, which came in a 1–1 draw with Coventry City on 31 August 1946. He went on to play a total of four league games for Burnley before moving to Wrexham in July 1950. He spent just one season in Wales and made eleven league appearances for the club.

References

1919 births
2003 deaths
Footballers from Burnley
English footballers
Association football defenders
Burnley F.C. players
Wrexham A.F.C. players
English Football League players